The Interdynamics MKR was a Swedish prototype assault rifle developed in the 1980s.  The weapon never proceeded beyond prototype stages.

Design
The Interdynamics MKR was originally designed using a 4.5×26mm MKR round using solid brass bullets. Its purpose was to provide a flat ballistic trajectory along with armor-piercing capabilities with low recoil for the user to handle, even when fired fully automatically.

It was to use low-cost ammunition. The 4.5×26mm MKR round was claimed to be ballistically as effective at 300 meters as the 5.56×45mm NATO round.

It was a bullpup design, which means that the magazine is located behind the trigger, and utilized the blowback system of operation. The bullpup design made the firearm smaller and lighter.

See also
List of bullpup firearms
List of assault rifles

References

Assault rifles of Sweden
Trial and research firearms of Sweden
Bullpup rifles